Glyphipterix erebanassa is a species of sedge moth in the genus Glyphipterix. It was described by Edward Meyrick in 1934. It is found in China, particularly Guangdong.

References

Moths described in 1934
Glyphipterigidae
Moths of Asia